Jamesia ramirezi is a species of beetle in the family Cerambycidae. It was described by Nearns and Tavakilian in 2012. It is known from Costa Rica.

References

Onciderini
Beetles described in 2012